Jijim may mean:

 Buchimgae, pan-fried Korean food made by cooking something on a greased frying pan
 Jijim, a type of Turkish rug made of strips of Kilim sewn together